The International Space Science Institute (ISSI) is an Institute of Advanced Studies based in Bern, Switzerland.
The institute's work is interdisciplinary, focusing on the study of the Solar System, and encompasses planetary sciences, astrophysics, cosmology, astrobiology, and the Earth sciences.
A main activity is the interpretation of experimental data collected by space research missions.

ISSI is a non-profit organization and a foundation under Swiss law.
ISSI operations are supported by grants from the European Space Agency, the Swiss Confederation and the Swiss Academy of Sciences (SCNAT). The University of Bern contributes through a grant to a Director and in-kind facilities.  

It was established in 1995.
Primary initial capital for the ISSI was provided by Oerlikon Space AG.

References

External links

Science and technology in Europe
Space organizations